Kohanabad (also Romanized as Kohanābād and Kahnābād) is a city in and capital of Kohanabad District, Aradan County, Semnan Province, Iran. At the 2006 census, its population was 1,630, in 457 families.

References 

Populated places in Aradan County
Cities in Semnan Province